Albert Campbell (born 4 January 1938 in Belfast, Northern Ireland) is a former footballer who played with Crusaders in the Irish League in the 1960s, and who won two full international caps for Northern Ireland (the first Crusaders player to be capped): against Wales in the 1963 Home Internationals and Switzerland in a World Cup match in 1964. He also won a 'B' international cap against France in 1959.

With Crusaders, he won the Ulster Cup and County Antrim Shield, and was part of the club's first Irish Cup-winning teams in 1967 and 1968. He was named the Ulster Footballer of the Year for the 1960/61 season.

References

External links 
Northern Ireland's Footballing Greats

1938 births
Association footballers from Northern Ireland
Northern Ireland international footballers
Ulster Footballers of the Year
Crusaders F.C. players
NIFL Premiership players
Living people
Association footballers from Belfast
Northern Ireland amateur international footballers
Association football central defenders